Hayley McIntosh (born 12 April 1999) is a New Zealand swimmer. She competed in the women's 400 metre freestyle event at the 2018 FINA World Swimming Championships (25 m), in Hangzhou, China. She also competed in the women's 800 metre freestyle and women's 4 × 200 metre freestyle relay events.

References

External links
 

1999 births
Living people
New Zealand female swimmers
New Zealand female freestyle swimmers
Swimmers at the 2020 Summer Olympics
Place of birth missing (living people)
20th-century New Zealand women
21st-century New Zealand women